Pertti Ahokas (born August 5, 1947) is a Finnish former professional ice hockey defenceman.

Ahokas played in the SM-sarja and SM-liiga for Jokerit, SaiPa, TuTo and TPS. He played 165 games in SM-sarja between 1969 and 1975 and 235 games in SM-liiga between 1975 and 1982.

References

External links

1947 births
Living people
Finnish ice hockey defencemen
Jokerit players
Imatran Ketterä players
People from Kuopio
SaiPa players
TuTo players
Sportspeople from North Savo
20th-century Finnish people